The 1910 Oregon Agricultural Aggies football team was an American football team that represented Oregon Agricultural College (now known as Oregon State University) as an independent during the 1910 college football season. In their first and only season under head coach George Schildmiller, the Aggies compiled a 3–2–1 record and were outscored by their opponents by a combined total of 43 to 27. Against major opponents, the Aggies defeated Washington State (9–3) and lost to Oregon (0–12) and Washington (0–22).  The team played its home games at Bell Field in Corvallis, Oregon. James Evenden was the team captain.

Schedule

References

Oregon Agricultural
Oregon State Beavers football seasons
Oregon Agricultural Aggies football